Pepper Binkley is an American actress, performer, writer, and director who works in film, television, theater, and commercials. She was a series regular in the fourth season of 1990s teen drama, Fifteen.

Career 
From 1992 to 1993, Binkley played the role of Pepper O'Brien in Fifteen, and later starred in a number of films, including Let Them Chirp Awhile (2007), Asylum Seekers (2009), and A Night Without Armor (2017). She created and starred in the 2018 web series, It's Freezing Out There, and has acted in numerous theatre productions, including Twelve Ophelias, Such Things Only Happen In Books, and My Dog Heart. To date, Binkley has appeared in approximately thirty TV shows and films.

Filmography

Film

Television

Audio Books
 The Last Song by Nicholas Sparks

References

Further reading

External links

Profile at RADA.

American film actresses
American television actresses
Year of birth missing (living people)
Living people
21st-century American actresses
Alumni of RADA
Place of birth missing (living people)